Lieutenant-Colonel Henry Vivian Montague Langtry (12 November 1869, Cheltenham, Gloucester - 22 August 1935, Southampton) was an officer of the Burma Military Police.

Langtry was originally commissioned into the 3rd (Militia) battalion Queen's Royal West Surrey Regiment as a Second Lieutenant 21 January 1888, be promoted Lieutenant 26 October 1889.

He was then commissioned into the regular battalions (1st or 2nd) of the Queen's Royal West Surrey Regiment as a Second Lieutenant 
4 February 1891. He first arrived in India 7 December 1891 and was appointed to the British Indian Army on 21 May 1892.

He was first appointed as an assistant commandant, Burma Military Police, May 1895 to May 1900.

On 30 July 1901 he was appointed to a civil position in Burma as an Assistant Commissioner, Burma Commission.

Promoted to captain 30 July 1901.

He was promoted to major 4 February 1909.

Appointed to the Supernumary List 30 July 1911, after ten years in civil employment.

In January 1917 he was appointed Deputy Commissioner 2nd grade

Promoted to lieutenant colonel 4 February 1917

In March 1918 he was appointed Adjutant of the Burma Military Police.
 
On 12 May 1925, after a long career, Langtry retired to Hampshire, where he remained until his death in Southampton in 1935.  His father was Col. Henry Langtry and mother Sofia Hailes, daughter of Captain Hailes of the 10th Bengal Cavalry.

Further reading
The British Army "Record of Services" Book (1926 edition) - For more on Langtry's military career.

References

 London Gazette (Various dates)
 Indian Army List (January 1908 & January 1919)
 Obituary, The Times (London, England), Thursday, 26 September 1935; p. 6; Issue 47179.

1869 births
1935 deaths
British Indian Army officers
Queen's Royal Regiment officers
British colonial police officers
Indian Army personnel of World War I
People from Cheltenham